Ruposhi Bangla (Beautiful Bengal) is the most popular collection of poems by Jibanananda Das, the great modern Bengali poet. Written in 1934, the sixty-two sonnets - discovered in an exercise-book twenty years after Das wrote them - achieved instant popularity on their posthumous publication in 1957, becoming a totemic symbol of freedom in Bangladesh's 1971 War of Independence. In Ruposhi Bangla, Das seamlessly blends in both real and mythical historical figures, as well as mythical creatures such as the shuk bird, weaving a tapestry of a beautiful, dreamlike Bengal The poems celebrate the beauty of Barishal. In these poems infused with a scent of unrequited love, Jibanananda Das captured his country's soul through evocations of village life and natural beauty.  Satyajit Ray designed the cover of 1957 edition.

References

Bengali poetry
1934 poetry books
Works by Jibanananda Das
1957 poetry books
Indian poetry collections
Bengali-language literature
Books published posthumously